Streptomyces rhizophilus is a bacterium species from the genus of Streptomyces which has been isolated from rhizosphere soil from the plant Sasa borealis.

See also 
 List of Streptomyces species

References

Further reading

External links
Type strain of Streptomyces rhizophilus at BacDive -  the Bacterial Diversity Metadatabase	

rhizophilus
Bacteria described in 2014